Voronok is a rural locality (a selo) and the administrative center of Voronokskoye Rural Settlement, Starodubsky District, Bryansk Oblast, Russia. The population was 1,139 as of 2010. There are 13 streets.

Geography 
Voronok is located 29 km south of Starodub (the district's administrative centre) by road. Strativa is the nearest rural locality.

References 

Rural localities in Starodubsky District